The 1924 United States presidential election in Michigan took place on November 4, 1924, as part of the 1924 United States presidential election. Voters chose 15 representatives, or electors, to the Electoral College, who voted for president and vice president.

Michigan supported Republican Party incumbent Calvin Coolidge of Massachusetts in the state's largest landslide in a presidential race as of the 2020 election. Coolidge received over 75% of the popular vote and won every county, while Democratic nominee John W. Davis of West Virginia garnered only 13.13%. Third-party candidate Robert M. La Follette Sr. of the Progressive Party collected 10% of the vote.

With 75.37% of the popular vote, Michigan would prove to be Coolidge's second strongest state in the 1924 election in terms of popular vote percentage after his birth state of Vermont. This is also the best Republican performance in a presidential election in Michigan to date.

Results

Results by county

See also
 United States presidential elections in Michigan

Notes

References

Michigan
1924
1924 Michigan elections